The Miss Alaska competition is a scholarship pageant that selects the representative for the state of Alaska in the Miss America pageant. Unlike most state-level pageants in the Miss America system, Alaska allows any eligible woman to enter the Miss Alaska pageant without first having to win a local qualifying pageant. 

Jessica Reisinger of Anchorage was crowned Miss Alaska 2022 on June 16, 2022, at the Alaska Center for the Performing Arts in Anchorage, Alaska. She represented Alaska and competed the title for Miss America 2023 at the Mohegan Sun in Uncasville, Connecticut in December 2022 where she was Women in STEM Finalist.

Gallery of past titleholders

Results summary
The following is a visual summary of the past results of Miss Alaska titleholders at the national Miss America pageants/competitions. The year in parentheses indicates the year of the national competition during which a placement and/or award was garnered, not the year attached to the contestant's state title.

Placements
Miss America: Emma Broyles (2022)
 Top 10: Joslyn Tinker (1999)
 Top 15: Angelina Klapperich (2018)

Awards

Preliminary awards
 Preliminary Lifestyle & Fitness: Joslyn Tinker (1999)
Preliminary Social Impact Pitch: Emma Broyles (2022)

Non-finalist awards
 Non-finalist Talent: Karol Hommon (1965), Kathy Tebow (1977), Maryline Blackburn (1985), Rebecca Nyboer (1994), Audrey Solomon (2001)

Other awards
 Miss Congeniality: Angelina Klapperich (2018)
 Bert Parks Talent Award: Audrey Solomon (2001)
 Charles and Theresa Brown Scholarship: Joslyn Tinker (1999), Eugenia Primis (2002), Stephany Jeffers (2008), Malie Delgado (2015), Emma Broyles (2021)
 Natural White's Smile of Confidence Scholarship: Beth Gustafson (1992)
 Special Judge's Award: Virginia Walker (1971), Linda Smith (1972)
 Women in STEM Finalists: Jessice Reisinger (2023)

Winners

Notes

References

External links

 

Annual events in Alaska
Lists of people from Alaska
Alaska
Women in Alaska